USS LST-447 was a United States Navy  used in the Asiatic-Pacific Theater during World War II.

Construction
LST-447 was laid down on 10 July 1942, under Maritime Commission (MARCOM) contract, MC hull 967, by  Kaiser Shipyards, Vancouver, Washington; launched on 22 September 1942;  and commissioned on 13 December 1942,.

Service history
During the war, LST-447 was assigned to the Pacific Theater of Operations. She took part in the consolidation of the southern Solomons in June 1943; the occupation and defense of Cape Torokina November and December 1943; the Green Islands landing February 1944; the Hollandia operation in April 1944; the assault and occupation of Guam July and August 1944; and the assault and occupation of Okinawa Gunto April 1945.

The tank landing ship was sunk off Okinawa on 7 April 1945, following a kamikaze attack. She was struck from the Navy list on 2 June 1945.

Honors and awards
LST-447 earned five battle stars for her World War II service.

Notes 

Citations

Bibliography 

Online resources

External links

 

LST-1-class tank landing ships
World War II amphibious warfare vessels of the United States
1942 ships
S3-M2-K2 ships
Ships built in Vancouver, Washington
Maritime incidents in April 1945